Jackson Township is one of eleven townships in Ripley County, Indiana. As of the 2010 census, its population was 965 and it contained 422 housing units.

Geography

Cities and towns
 Napoleon

References

External links
 Indiana Township Association
 United Township Association of Indiana

Townships in Ripley County, Indiana
Townships in Indiana